Monocacy Creek (pronounced muh-naw-cuh-see) is a tributary of the Lehigh River in Northampton County, Pennsylvania, in the United States.

One of only 56 limestone streams in the state of Pennsylvania, the creek's headwaters lie in the Slate Belt, near the borough of Chapman. From Chapman, the Monocacy follows a 20.3-mile (32.7 km) course through the limestone Lehigh Valley. In all, the creek drains an area of about 49.6 square miles, flowing through six townships, including Bushkill, Moore, East Allen, Upper Nazareth, Lower Nazareth, and Hanover before reaching its confluence with the Lehigh River in Bethlehem. The Monocacy Creek Watershed Association protects the creek and its tributaries. They hold creek cleanups and other conservationalist events. 

The creek's name is a corruption of the Native American menagassi, which means "stream with several large bends". Its spelling has had many variants. In the 1700's, the creek was referred to as Manakisy and Manakesis. Later spellings included Manakes, Manoquesay, Manockisy, and Manokissy. As late as 1883, it was known as the Manokesy River, but by the 20th century the spelling became standardized as Monocacy.

Gallery

See also
List of rivers of Pennsylvania

References

External links
U.S. Geological Survey: PA stream gaging stations

Bethlehem, Pennsylvania
Tributaries of the Lehigh River
Rivers of Pennsylvania
Rivers of Northampton County, Pennsylvania